mad President is a Reggae album by Maiko Zulu. The album was produced in 2006 with the hit song Mad president. Zambian owned state media, ZNBC refused to play the song. The song Mad president talks of a tyranny president, who thinks he the judge, policeman, prosecutor, he hires and dismiss staff whenever he feel like

References

2006 albums
Maiko Zulu albums